This is a list of Statutory Instruments made in the United Kingdom in the year 2022.

1-100

101-200

201-300

301-400

401-500

501-600

601-700

701-800

801-900

901-1000

1001-1100

1101-1406

See also

Notes

References

External links
 Coronavirus Statutory Instruments dashboard – Hansard Society

Law of the United Kingdom
Lists of Statutory Instruments of the United Kingdom